Brandon Brown (born September 18, 1991) is an American professional basketball player for Juventus Utena of the Lithuanian Basketball League (LKL).. Standing at 1.80 m (6'0"), he plays at the Point guard position. After playing four years of college basketball at Phoenix College and at Loyola Marymount, Brown entered the 2017 NBA draft, but he was not selected in the draft's two rounds. He was the Swiss League Top Scorer in 2018, averaging 27 points per game.

High school career
Brown played high school basketball at Cesar Chavez High School in Phoenix, Arizona. After high school, he served a two year prison term.

College career
Brown played his first two years of college basketball at Phoenix College, until 2015. He earned Spalding National JUCO Division II player of the year honor after averaging  20.1 points and 6.1 assists per game. After two years, Brown transferred to Loyola Marymount, where he averaged 13.2 points, 4.9 assists and 2.9 rebounds per game in his last two seasons.

Professional career
After going undrafted in the 2017 NBA draft, Brown joined Boncourt of the Swiss League. He played 30 games with the club and he was the Swiss League Top Scorer of the 2018 season, after averaging 27 points per game. He also added 3.5 rebounds and 3.3 assists per game.

On September 25, 2018, he joined Panionios of the Greek Basket League. On November 27, 2018, he joined Poitiers 86 of the Pro B.

On August 20, 2019, he signed for Rilski Sportist of the NBL. Brown averaged 15.6 points, 5.5 assists and 1.7 steals per game. He re-signed with the team on July 23, 2020.

References

External links
ESPN.com
RealGM.com Profile

1991 births
Living people
American expatriate basketball people in France
American expatriate basketball people in Greece
American expatriate basketball people in Switzerland
American men's basketball players
Basketball players from Phoenix, Arizona
Loyola Marymount Lions men's basketball players
Panionios B.C. players
Phoenix Bears men's basketball players
Poitiers Basket 86 players
Power forwards (basketball)
Union Neuchâtel Basket players